Brand New Congress was an American political action committee with the mission to elect hundreds of new progressive congressional representatives in line with the campaign's political platform.

Background 
Brand New Congress is a volunteer-led American political organization that intends to run hundreds of campaigns for United States Congress with candidates of the organization's choosing by the 2018 midterm elections, regardless of party affiliation. The organization plans to make staffing and fundraising decisions for all its candidates at once. About 20 volunteers from Bernie Sanders's 2016 presidential campaign formed the group in April 2016 as Sanders conceded the primary to Hillary Clinton. They planned the organization to support Sanders's platform and carry its supporters' momentum into policymaking. Brand New Congress planned to announce 50 candidates by March 2017 and over 400 by July 2017. Of the 535 total seats in the United States Congress (House and Senate), 468 were up for reelection in 2018. The group ran both Democratic and Republican candidates, depending on regional demographics, as well as independents when an incumbent wins the primary. Brand New Congress requires candidates to align with Sanders's presidential platform, regardless of party affiliation. While there are large differences in Republican and Democratic policies, Brand New Congress hopes that people will unify under the goal of reforming Congress.

The group attended the July 2016 Democratic National Convention to canvass for support in protester sites and throughout the city. By then the group had raised $85,000, about 90% of it in small donations. Its email list contained 20,000 addresses. Brand New Congress began a tour of 100 cities in mid-2016. Founding members of the group were encouraged by the success of the Sanders campaign's grassroots fundraising, which surpassed the Clinton campaign's several times in monthly income. As of October 2016, the group was accepting nominations for future candidates and openly developing its economic platform.

In March 2017, Brand New Congress announced that it had teamed up with Justice Democrats to further its goals. On March 14, 2023, it announced that it would cease operations.

Candidates

2018
In the 2018 primary season, Brand New Congress officially endorsed 30 candidates:

2020
Brand New Congress endorsed 46 candidates for the Senate and House. Nine House candidates and one Senate candidate made it to the general election (two incumbents, eight newcomers). Both incumbents and two newcomers won.

U.S. Senate

U.S. House

2021

U.S. House

2022

U.S. Senate

U.S. House

Notes

Platform 
Their platform contains many progressive priorities, with the following overarching goals:
 Rebuild the economy through infrastructure and community investment.
 Fix the healthcare system with Medicare for All and increased access to medical services.
 End mass incarceration by ending the War on Drugs and demilitarizing police.
 Fight for families through fixing schools and family leave.
 Clean up Washington D.C. by cutting taxes for middle and low income people and removing money from politics.
 Reform our immigration system with employment verification systems and global legal immigration centers.
 Stop fighting reckless wars and instead support economic development as with the Marshall Plan.
 Address climate change through building a green economy and a 100% renewable energy system.

Summer for Progress 
Several progressive organizations, including Our Revolution, Justice Democrats, Democratic Socialists of America, National Nurses United, Working Families Party, and Fight for 15, announced in July 2017 a push to encourage House Democrats to sign on to a #PeoplesPlatform, which consists of supporting "eight bills currently in the House of Representatives that will address the concerns of everyday Americans." These eight bills and the topics they address are:
 Medicare for All: H.R. 676 Medicare For All Act
 Free College Tuition: H.R. 1880 College for All Act of 2017
 Worker Rights: H.R.15 - Raise the Wage Act 
 Women's Rights: H.R.771 - Equal Access to Abortion Coverage in Health Insurance (EACH Woman) Act of 2017 
 Voting Rights: H.R. 2840 - Automatic Voter Registration Act
 Environmental Justice: Climate Change Bill - TBD
 Criminal Justice and Immigrant Rights: H.R. 3227 - Justice is Not For Sale Act of 2017
 Taxing Wall Street: H.R. 1144 - Inclusive Prosperity Act

See also 
 Our Revolution – the official political action organization spun out of the 2016 Bernie Sanders presidential campaign
 Justice Democrats – a PAC dedicated to replacing corporate-backed Democratic Congressional representatives

References

External links 

 

2016 establishments in the United States
115th United States Congress
Bernie Sanders 2016 presidential campaign
Political organizations established in 2016
Progressive organizations in the United States
United States political action committees